Saxeville is an unincorporated community in the town of Saxeville in Waushara County, Wisconsin, United States. It is located at the intersection of County W and County A.

References

Unincorporated communities in Waushara County, Wisconsin
Unincorporated communities in Wisconsin